Kojid (also Romanized as Kojīd and Kejīd; also known as Kūjed) is a village in Kojid Rural District, Rankuh District, Amlash County, Gilan Province, Iran. At the 2006 census, its population was 245, in 92 families.

References 

Populated places in Amlash County